Parliamentary elections are due to be held in Montenegro no later than June 2023.

Background
Following the results of 2020 Montenegrin parliamentary election, which resulted in a victory for the opposition and the fall from power of the ruling DPS, after ruling country for 30 years, three opposition lists, ZBCG, MNN and the URA, agreed to form an expert government led by university professor Zdravko Krivokapić. According to the final agreement of the parties, the new government will be limited to one year, with the main goals; the fight against corruption and the depoliticization of public institutions after 30 years of DPS rule, as well as the reform of electoral laws, due to the preparation of an atmosphere for holding a new, "first fairly organized" elections. Right-wing populist DF, announced limited support for the Krivokapić Cabinet, hoping for new parliamentary elections in late 2021. While the opposition nationalist DPS of President Đukanović announced future activities within the so-called "Montenegrin statehood bloc", together with its long-standing minor coalition partners; the SD and LP, as well with some newly formed nationalist parties and initiatives, invoking its role in restoring Montenegrin statehood in 2006, as well accusing the new cabinet of allegedly "threatening Montenegro's national interests, sovereignty and independence". In August 2022, the government collapsed and parties either had to form a new coalition or a new election had to be called.

On 16 March 2023, President Milo Đukanović dissolved the parliament, after the parliamentary majority was unable to form a new government for several months, thus prompting new parliamentary elections.

Electoral system 
The 81 seats of the Parliament of Montenegro are elected in a single nationwide constituency using closed list proportional representation. Seats are allocated using the d'Hondt method with a 3% electoral threshold. However, minority groups that account for no more than 15% of the population in a district are given an exemption that lowers the electoral threshold to 0.7%. The parties of the same minority are summed up when calculating the seats to a maximum of three seats. A separate exemption is given to ethnic Croats whereby if no list representing the population passes the 0.7% threshold, the list with the most votes will win one seat if it receives more than 0.35% of the vote.

Opinion polls
Poll results are listed in the table below in reverse chronological order, showing the most recent first, and using the date the survey's fieldwork was done, as opposed to the date of publication. If such date is unknown, the date of publication is given instead. The highest percentage figure in each polling survey is displayed in bold, and the background shaded in the leading party's colour. In the instance that there is a tie, then no figure is shaded. The lead column on the right shows the percentage-point difference between the two parties with the highest figures. When a specific poll does not show a data figure for a party, the party's cell corresponding to that poll is shown empty. The threshold for a party to elect members is 3%.

Notes

References

2023 elections in Montenegro
Montenegro